Craig Julian Stevens (born 23 July 1980) is an Australian former freestyle swimmer specialising in the 400m, 800m and 1500m freestyle events. He was an Australian Institute of Sport scholarship holder.

Stevens was the bronze medallist in the 1500m freestyle event at the 2002 Commonwealth Games, but he narrowly missed out on a medal in the 400m freestyle, finishing 4th.

In 2004, Stevens made his Olympic Games debut at Athens. There, he won silver as part of the Australian 4×200m relay team and also made the final in the 1500m. He relinquished his place in the 400m freestyle for world record holder Ian Thorpe, who had been disqualified from the event at the Australian trials.

Stevens was initially left out of the Australian team for the 2006 Commonwealth Games in his home country. However, Ian Thorpe had to withdraw from the games due to illness, which allowed Stevens to take Thorpe's place in the team. After qualifying as the fastest heat swimmer, he again came 4th in the 400m freestyle final. He also contested the 1500m freestyle final and finished in 6th place.

In March 2007, Stevens won his first World Championship medal after finishing 3rd in the 800m freestyle final with a personal best time of 7:48.67. After the disqualification of Oussama Mellouli, Stevens was elevated to 2nd. At the same meet, he also broke the 15-minute barrier in the 1500m freestyle for the first time, finishing 6th in the final with a time of 14:59.11.

Stevens qualified for the Australian Olympic swimming team for the Beijing 2008 Summer Olympics on 29 March 2008 at the Australian Olympic Qualifiers at Homebush in Sydney. He qualified for both the 400m and 1500m freestyle events. He finished 2nd behind Grant Hackett in the 1500m with a personal best of 14:53.18, making him the third fastest  Australian 1500m swimmer in history.

Stevens failed to qualify for the finals of the 400m freestyle at the Olympics as he was comprehensively out-swum, finishing in 8th place in heat three, 7 seconds behind the winner. In the 1500m freestyle, Stevens again failed to make the finals finishing 5th in heat four, some 17 seconds behind the winner and 8 seconds outside of his personal best.

Post-retirement life
Stevens retired from competitive swimming in 2008. After retiring from swimming, he worked first as a bank teller and then for Toyota. He is now head swimming coach at Sans Souci Leisure Centre in Sans Souci, New South Wales.

See also
 List of Commonwealth Games medallists in swimming (men)
 List of Olympic medalists in swimming (men)

References

1980 births
Living people
Sportsmen from New South Wales
Swimmers from Sydney
Australian male freestyle swimmers
Olympic swimmers of Australia
Swimmers at the 2008 Summer Olympics
Swimmers at the 2004 Summer Olympics
Olympic silver medalists for Australia
Australian Institute of Sport swimmers
World Aquatics Championships medalists in swimming
Medalists at the 2004 Summer Olympics
Commonwealth Games bronze medallists for Australia
Olympic silver medalists in swimming
Swimmers at the 2002 Commonwealth Games
Commonwealth Games medallists in swimming
People educated at Endeavour Sports High School
Goodwill Games medalists in swimming
Competitors at the 2001 Goodwill Games
21st-century Australian people
Medallists at the 2002 Commonwealth Games